"Cult of Snap" is a song recorded by German Eurodance group Snap!. It was released in September 1990 as the third single from their debut studio album, World Power (1990). The song reached No. 1 in Spain for four weeks and it also peaked at No. 2 in Austria and Zimbabwe. Snap! performed the song on the British TV show Top of the Pops.

The song was re-recorded and included on their 2003 remix album The Cult of Snap! featuring Roy Malone.

Chart performance
"Cult of Snap" was a major hit on the charts on several continents. In Europe, it peaked at number-one in Spain for four weeks and was a top 10 hit also in Austria, Belgium, Finland, Germany, Greece, Ireland, Italy, the Netherlands, Norway, Portugal, Switzerland and the United Kingdom. In the latter, the single reached number eight in its second week at the UK Singles Chart, on September 23, 1990. Outside Europe, "Cult of Snap" peaked at number two in Zimbabwe, number 15 in New Zealand and number 27 in Australia.

Critical reception
AllMusic editor Andrew Hamilton remarked the "choppy rhythms" of "Cult of Snap" in his review of World Power. American magazine Billboard described it as an "African-infused house jam". Marisa Fox from Entertainment Weekly felt it is "a dark song, with African drumbeats and chanting." Pan-European magazine Music & Media found that rapper Turbo B "raps like he's shouting orders over a monotone techno beat, spiced up with oriental and African samples." David Giles from Music Week concluded, "The best record from this outfit yet. Snap tap into a slightly salsa-based groove that stands out a mile among all the Funky Drummers, and decorate it with rapping. Afro-harmonies, and oriental melodies. A huge hit." NME noted its "tribal rhythms and chanting", "to stomp away the evenings to" on Ibiza. A reviewer from Newcastle Evening Chronicle named it one of the best songs from the album.

Music video
A tribal music video was released to promote the song. It sees the band members belly dancing and charming a snake. The video was directed by Liam Kan. He also directed the music video for the group's previous single, "Ooops Up".

Track listings
 7-inch single (Logic 113 596)
 "Cult of Snap" (World Power Radio Mix) — 3:59
 "Blasé Blasé" — 4:32

 CD maxi (Logic 663 596 )
 "Cult of Snap" (World Power Mix) — 6:30
 "Cult of Snap"  (Album Version) — 5:18
 "Cult of Snap" (World Power Radio Mix) — 3:59
 "Cult of Snap"  (E-Version) — 5:54

 German Remix CD (Logic 663 639)
 "Cult of Snap" (The Modno 2000 Mix) — 5:25
 "Cult of Snap"  (The Virtual Dub Mix) — 4:39
 "Cult of Snap" (The Elektra Mix) — 5:25

Charts

Weekly charts

Year-end charts

See also
 List of number-one singles of 1990 (Spain)

References

Snap! songs
1990 singles
1990 songs
Logic Records singles
Music videos directed by Liam Kan
Number-one singles in Spain